Charles Illingworth (11 February 1871 – 15 December 1926) was an Australian rules footballer who played with Melbourne in the Victorian Football League (VFL).

Notes

External links 

Charlie Illingworth on Demonwiki

1871 births
1926 deaths
Australian rules footballers from Victoria (Australia)
Melbourne Football Club players
Bairnsdale Football Club players